VanLandingham Estate is a historic home located at Charlotte, Mecklenburg County, North Carolina.  It was built in 1913–1914, and is a large two-story, wood-shingled, Bungalow / American Craftsman style dwelling. The entrance features a low roofed canopy supported on stone piers and it has a hipped terra cotta tile roof.  The house is set in carefully landscaped grounds originally designed by Leigh Colyer, one of the region's earliest landscape architects.

It was listed on the National Register of Historic Places in 1983. Currently, the building is being used as a bed and breakfast.

References

Houses on the National Register of Historic Places in North Carolina
Houses completed in 1914
Houses in Charlotte, North Carolina
National Register of Historic Places in Mecklenburg County, North Carolina